Juan de la Cerda, 5th Duke of Medinaceli (1544 – 29 May 1594), Grandee of Spain, (in full), was a Spanish nobleman and Ambassador in Portugal.

He was the son of Don Juan de la Cerda, 4th Duke of Medinaceli and of Joana Manuel, daughter of Sancho de Noronha, 2nd Count of Faro. In 1565 he married  Donna Isabella d’Aragona, daughter of Don Antonio d’Aragona, 2nd Duke of Montalto with whom he had two children. In 1580, he married for a second time, with Juana de la Lama, 4th Marchioness of la Adrada, a widow since 1571 of Don Gabriel de la Cueva, 5th Duke of Alburquerque, deceased as a Governor of the Duchy of Milan, Italy,  with whom he had two more children.

Sources

1544 births
1594 deaths
Dukes of Medinaceli
Marquesses of Cogolludo
Counts of Puerto de Santa María
Grandees of Spain
Juan 05
Knights of the Golden Fleece